Pteridiosperma is a former genus of fungi within the Ceratostomataceae family.

All the species have been transferred to Microthecium .

References

External links 
 Pteridiosperma at Index Fungorum

Sordariomycetes genera
Melanosporales